The Hauptstrasse 29 is a main road in the Swiss canton of Graubünden, with a total length of . From the summit of the pass the road descends into the Val di Poschiavo and passes through San Carlo, Poschiavo, Le Prese and Brusio before reaching the border with Italy at Campocologno.

For much of its route north of the pass, and again south of Poschiavo, the road is closely paralleled by the Bernina railway line. Indeed at a few locations south of Poschiavo, the railway line runs within the carriageway of the road, with road vehicles having to give way to trains.

References 

Roads in Switzerland
Transport in Graubünden
Samedan
Pontresina
Poschiavo
Brusio